Lost in the Dark (Italian: Sperduti nel buio) is a 1914 Italian silent drama film directed by Nino Martoglio and starring Giovanni Grasso Sr., Maria Carmi and Virginia Balestrieri. It is one of a number of films which have been suggested as an early move in the direction of Italian neorealism, although this is impossible to verify since the only surviving copy of the film was destroyed by German forces during the Second World War. The film is based on a 1901 play of the same title by Roberto Bracco.

Cast
 Giovanni Grasso Sr. as Nunzio the blind man  
 Maria Carmi as Livia Blanchard  
 Virginia Balestrieri as Paolina  
 Vittorina Moneta as Paolina's mother 
 Dillo Lombardi as Duke of Vallenza  
 Totò Majorana as Nunzio's stepfather 
 Gina Benvenuti as Nunzio's mother 
 Maria Balistrieri 
 Ettore Mazzanti

References

Bibliography 
 Reich, Jacqueline & Garofalo, Piero. Re-viewing Fascism: Italian Cinema, 1922-1943. Indiana University Press, 2002.

External links 
 

1914 films
Italian silent feature films
Italian drama films
1914 drama films
1910s Italian-language films
Lost Italian films
Italian black-and-white films
1914 lost films
Silent drama films